Zheng Zhengqiu (January 25, 1889 – July 16, 1935) was a Chinese filmmaker often considered a "founding father" of Chinese cinema.

Biography
Born in Shanghai in 1889, Zheng Zhengqiu was a young intellectual involved in China's theater scene when he and his friend and colleague, Zhang Shichuan, made the first Chinese feature film, a short film titled, The Difficult Couple in 1913. The two men would come together again in 1922 with the founding of the seminal Mingxing Film Company and the oldest surviving classic Laborer's Love, which would dominate Shanghai's film industry for the next fifteen years.

While with Mingxing, Zheng served not only as screenwriter and director, but as a studio manager and producer, personally writing and directing 53 films before his early death in 1935. Like many of his colleagues during the period, Zheng was devoted to leftist causes and social justice, themes that were evident in many of his works.

After his partner, Zhang Shichuan, rescued Xuan Jinglin from a brothel, Zheng Zhengqiu devised her stage name. He based it on the name she had adopted in the brothel and a transliteration of Lillian Gish into Chinese said in a Shanghai accent.

Partial directorial filmography

References

External links
 
 Zheng Zhengqiu at the Chinese Movie Database

Film directors from Shanghai
Screenwriters from Shanghai
1889 births
1935 deaths
Cinema pioneers
Chinese silent film directors
20th-century screenwriters